Your Computer may refer to:
 Your Computer (Australian magazine), a monthly computer magazine, 1981–1997 
 Your Computer (British magazine), a monthly computer magazine, 1981–1988